ACP S. Kulasingam s/o Sabaratnam (August 12th, 1931 - November 29th, 2007), was a retired Malaysian police officer and was considered the most fearless police officer in the 1970s.

Early life
Kulasingam Sabaratnam was born on August 12th, 1931 in Seremban, Negeri Sembilan. He received his education at the St. Paul school (Senior Cambridge) in 1950.

Police career
Kulasingam joined the Police Force on 1 July 1951 as Probationary Inspector. After completing basic police training at the Police Training Center at Jalan Gurney (now Jalan Semarak) Kuala Lumpur, he was assigned to Butterworth, Penang. During the Malayan Emergency, he served as an Estate Guard Officer for three months before being assigned to Bukit Mertajam, Penang as an Investigating Officer in September 1955; Prosecutor Officer in the same place for six months. In 1957, he was assigned to the Pahang Contingent Police Headquarters and he was also promoted to Assistant Superintendent of Police (ASP) in the same year.

Later, he was assigned to Johor Contingent Police Headquarters as Head of the Criminal Investigation Division and District Traffic Chief in 1959; he also served in Unit No. 3 at Ipoh District Police Headquarters, Perak in 1960. He also served in Brunei in 1963 and Sarawak in 1964. He also served in Police Field Force (now General Operations Force) at Kroh, Perak as Commander of the Training School. In 1966 to 1969, he served in Sarawak as Commander of the 3rd Battalion of the Police Field Force.

In 1970, he was placed at Bukit Aman Internal Security and Public Order Department, Kuala Lumpur (KDN/KA) for two years. Until 1979, he served the in Criminal Investigation Department in Kuala Lumpur Contingent Police Headquarters before being placed in the D4A Division at Bukit Aman, Kuala Lumpur in 1980. He was appointed as the Head of the Johor Criminal Investigation Department in 1982 until his retirement on 15 September 1985 with the rank of Assistant Commissioner of Police.

Arrestment of Kepong Chai
DSP Kula's reputation was so huge back then that even infamous criminals like Kepong Chai — a rapist with a penchant for scarring the faces of women with a blade — were threatened by him. He was successfully arrested by him.

Eliminated Gang Luku
On April 7th, 1976, DSP Kulasingam together with Chief Inspector I/2813 Gui Poh Choon raided the house at No. 20, Jalan 20/7, Paramount Garden, Petaling Jaya, Selangor. In the house were 4 brutal robbers which already robbed a goldsmith shop a day before. He was badly shot in his stomach but he was still able to fight the criminals. Luckily, he survived the incident. After the incident, both were conferred the Star of the Commander of Valour in the same year by His Majesty Yang di-Pertuan Agong Sultan Yahya Petra.

Shot by Botak Chin
Another criminal that was threatened by DSP Kula was the criminal named Botak Chin a.k.a. Wong Swee Chin, who robbed nearly RM300,000 after shooting a security guard carrying money at the Horse Racing Club in Kuala Lumpur. Kulasingam was tasked to hunt down him. Botak Chin's violence escalated on 22 November 1975, when he and his gang attempted to kill DSP Kula at a traffic light intersection near Jalan Davis, Kuala Lumpur.

They ambushed his vehicle after tailing him and started firing bullets at the policeman. It was reported that at least 11 bullets hit his vehicle, one of which shattered DSP Kula's rib, ripped through his liver, and punctured his lung, before lodging close to his spine.

Despite the life-threatening injury, DSP Kula drove himself to the Cheras police station. On 16 February 1976, Chin was arrested and his gang following a raid and shoot-out at a sawmill in Jalan Ipoh, Kuala Lumpur.

Death
On 29 November 2007, Kulasingam passed away in a hospital due to poor health.

Honours
 :
 Member of the Order of the Defender of the Realm (A.M.N.) (1968)
 Recipient of the Star of the Commander of Valour (P.G.B.) (1976)

References

Malaysian police officers
Members of the Order of the Defender of the Realm
Recipients of the Star of the Commander of Valour
1931 births
2007 deaths
People from Negeri Sembilan